Neeme may refer to:
 Neeme, Harju County, village in Jõelähtme Parish, Harju County
 Neeme, Saare County, village in Kihelkonna Parish, Saare County
 Neeme (given name), Estonian masculine given name